Cecilia Trifogli, FBA (born 7 February 1961) is an Italian philosopher and academic. She has been Professor of Medieval Philosophy at the University of Oxford since 2008, and a Fellow of All Souls College since 1999. Her research focuses on philosophy in the Middle Ages, including epistemology, metaphysics, and the reception of Aristotle's philosophy.

Early life
Trifogli was born on 7 February 1961 in Rome, Italy. She was educated at the University of Pisa, graduating with a Laurea in Philosophy in 1986 and a Laurea in Mathematics in 1995. She then undertook postgraduate studies at the University of Milan from 1996 to 2000.

Academic career
In October 1999, she joined the University of Oxford as a lecturer in philosophy. In 2008, she was appointed Professor of Medieval Philosophy.

She is (since 2008) chairman of the British Academy Medieval Texts Editorial Committee, and president of the ‘Aristoteles Latinus’ Commission of the International Society for the Study of Medieval Philosophy.

Honours
In 2014 she was elected a Fellow of the British Academy, the United Kingdom's national academy for the humanities and social sciences.

References

1961 births
Living people
Italian philosophers
Italian women academics
Fellows of All Souls College, Oxford
Academics of the University of Oxford
Fellows of the British Academy
University of Pisa alumni
University of Milan alumni
Writers from Rome
Scholars of medieval philosophy